Prievoz viaduct is a  viaduct in Bratislava, Slovakia. It is located on the D1 highway and spans several streets and the main railroad near the borough of Ružinov. On the viaduct there are 2 interchanges: one full (Gagarinova street) and one partial (Galvaniho street, close to the airport).
The viaduct was built from 1999 to 2002 and opened on August 30, 2002.

External links
 Some pictures of the viaduct

Bridges in Slovakia
Transport in Bratislava
Bridges completed in 2002
Buildings and structures in Bratislava
2002 establishments in Slovakia